Rhys Jenkins is a Welsh name given to 

Rhys Jenkins (rugby union), Welsh rugby union player
Rhys Jenkins (runner), Welsh ultramarathon runner